KVRX (91.7 FM) is the student radio station at the University of Texas in Austin,
Texas, with an effective radiated power of 3,000 watts. Licensed to The University of Texas, KVRX shares the 91.7 frequency with KOOP, broadcasting from 7 p.m. to 9 a.m. Monday through Friday and from 10 p.m. to 9 a.m. Saturday and Sunday, with KOOP, operated by Austin Co-op Radio, broadcasting during the remaining hours.  KVRX's studios are at the Hearst Student Media Building on campus, and its transmitter is located in East Austin.

kvrx.org broadcasts via the internet and through iTunes Radio, TuneIn.com and an iPhone app 24 hours a day, seven days a week.

History
In the Spring of 1986, students at the University of Texas at Austin formed a committee called the Student Radio Task Force with the intention of raising both institutional and student support for a campus radio station. Two years later, SRTF had secured the support of Texas Student Publications (now Texas Student Media, the University organization which houses all student media and publication outlets). Before receiving its broadcasting license, the fledgling station used the call sign KTSB, and began its first narrowcast via cable television in April 1988.

KTSB's call letters were changed to KVRX nearly six years later in January 1994, after the FCC approved a unique time-share agreement between KTSB and KOOP for the 91.7 FM frequency, the last remaining non-commercial frequency in Austin (the call letters "KTSB" were already in use by another station, necessitating the change). KVRX would go on to broadcast on the FM frequency in November 1994.

Programming
KVRX's slogan is "None of the Hits, All of the Time," and more recently, "Your Texas Independent Music Authority." Both refer to the station's alternative programming. KVRX's format includes music, news, sports and community programming, including the popular "Local Live" segment that airs every Sunday 10-11 p.m. CST. "Local Live" features both local and nationally touring musical acts in live, in-studio broadcast performances and interviews. KVRX only plays music that is not featured on commercial media outlets, and the varied community programs cover local, national and worldwide issues that often do not get covered in mainstream print and broadcast outlets. Notable artists that have performed on "Local Live" to later gain greater recognition include The Black Keys, Spoon, ...And You Will Know Us by the Trail of Dead, Death Cab For Cutie, Ratatat, Shearwater, Kinky Friedman, Acid Mothers Temple, Animal Collective, Explosions in the Sky, Mitski and Daniel Johnston. Each year KVRX staff and volunteers select the best "Local Live" recordings and include them on an annual Local Live CD (and occasionally DVD) compilation. Another program nearly as old as the station itself is "Lone Star Lullabies", which features a playlist of all-Texas music.

In addition to its radio programming, KVRX maintains an active presence in the Austin, Texas independent music scene by organizing live concerts and official shows, including during the South by Southwest music festival each Spring. The station's Music Directors produce a weekly "Topless 39" chart that tracks the 39 albums receiving the most plays that week. In 2010, the station launched its own dedicated YouTube channel. In 2019, the station hosted its very first music festival named KVRX Fest, the largest ever student-run music festival. It featured two days of live music split between Austin venues Cheer Up Charlies and Symphony Square. Notable artists include Frankie Cosmos, Fat Tony, Drab Majesty, and Video Age amongst others. KVRX has been described as a "nationally respected station and blueprint for many other college frequencies."

KVRX is part of Texas Student Media (officially Texas Student Publications), an auxiliary establishment of The University of Texas and the largest student media operation in the United States. KVRX is funded by underwriting, fundraising events, an annual pledge drive, listener contributions and sponsored public service announcements.

Notable alumni
 Debbie Cerda, 1994-1997 (film critic and contributing photographer, Slackerwood.com, member of Austin Film Critics Association)
 Britt Daniel, 1992-1995 (Spoon)
 John Dial (software designer, porn music expert)
 Thomas Fawcett (contributing writer, Austin Chronicle and Living Blues)
 Doug Freeman (founder, www.austinsound.net; contributing writer, Austin Chronicle)
 Jenn Garrison, 1997 - 2000 (film editor/director/producer, former commercial DJ)
 Rodney Gibbs (chief innovation officer for The Texas Tribune, board member of Austin Film Society, advisory board member of KLRU) 
 Lotic (electronic musician)
 Rosa Madriz (talent buyer/ Transmission Events; owner, Green Potato Ventures)
 Austin Powell (staff writer, Austin Chronicle)
 Jonathan Toubin (professional DJ and founder of New York Night Train)
 Luke Winkie (contributing writer, Austin Chronicle)
 Erik Wofford (producer/engineer, Cacophony Recorders)

See also
List of radio stations in Texas

References

External links
KVRX 91.7 FM official website

Last.fm music profile

VRX
Texas Student Media
VRX
Radio stations established in 1986
1986 establishments in Texas